Square House Museum  may refer to

Carson County Square House Museum NRHP in Panhandle, Texas
Central Square Station Museum Central Square, New York
Heritage Square Museum Los Angeles, California
Heritage Square Museum (New York) Ontario, New York
Quincy Square Museum Earlville, New York
Square House Museum (Rye, New York)
Square House Museum (Tarrytown, New York)